The Vedettes côtières de surveillance maritime (VCSM, "coastal boats for sea surveillance") are swift craft of the French Gendarmerie maritime. 24 boats of the type have been commissioned. They are based in various harbours of France, and are used for coast guard duties ranging from rescue to military tasks, including monitoring of pollution, sea police, and interception of illegal immigrants and drug traffickers.

The VCSM carry a custom-designed rigid-hull tender in a well deck. This deck can be converted into a helicopter airlift zone.

The boats do not carry heavy armament, but light machine guns can be installed when needed. In addition, infantry small arms are carried by the crew.

Ships in Gendarmerie maritime service 
The ships in Gendarmerie maritime service are named for rivers of the harbours in which they were initially based

 P601 Élorn  (Concarneau)
 P602 Verdon  (La Réunion; deployed in Mayotte as of early 2023)  
 P603 Adour  (Anglet)  
 P604 Scarpe  (Boulogne-sur-Mer)  
 P605 Vertonne  (Sables d'Olonne)   
 P606 Dumbea  (Nouméa)  
 P607 Yser  (Dieppe)   
 P608 Argens  (Saint Raphaël)   
 P609 Hérault  (Sète)   
 P610 Gravona  (Ajaccio)   
 P611 Odet  (Mayotte)   
 P612 Maury  (Gruissan)   
 P613 Charente  (Rochefort, transferred to Cayenne in 2022 replacing Mahury)
 P614 Tech  (Port Vendres) 
 P615 Penfeld  (Brest) 
 P616 Trieux  (Saint Malo) 
 P617 Vésubie  (Nice) 
 P618 Escaut  (Dunkerque) 
 P619 Huveaune  (Marseille) 
 P620 Sèvre  (Pornichet) 
 P621 Aber-Wrach  (Brest) 
 P622 Esteron  (Le Havre) 
 P623 Mahury  (Cayenne, unservicable as of 2022)
 P624 Organabo  (Kourou)

Citations

External links 

  Les vedettes côtières de surveillance maritime (VCSM), netmarine.net 
 Also sold to Senegal (Sangomar & Djiferre) and Mauritania (Megsem Bakkar & Oum Tounsi).

Patrol vessels of France